University Press of America was an academic imprint of the Rowman & Littlefield Publishing Group that specialized in the publication of scholarly works. Founded in 1975, the press purchased the Rowman & Littlefield publishing house in 1987, and in 1998, it later adopted the Rowman & Littlefield name as its own. After this change "University Press of America" became an imprint of the larger Rowman & Littlefield Publishing Group.

References 

Publishing companies established in 1975
Academic publishing companies
Publishing companies of the United States
Book publishing companies based in Maryland
American companies established in 1975